Tilia miqueliana is a species of linden.

In Japan, Tilia miqueliana is among hibakujumoku plants.

References

miqueliana
Trees of Japan